Memorial Bridge may refer to:

Thailand
 Memorial Bridge (Bangkok)

United States
 Memorial Bridge (Augusta, Maine)
 Memorial Bridge (Connellsville), Pennsylvania
 Memorial Bridge (Massachusetts), in Springfield
 Memorial Bridge (Palatka, Florida)
 Memorial Bridge (Parkersburg, West Virginia)
 Memorial Bridge (Portsmouth, New Hampshire)
 Memorial Bridge (Roanoke, Virginia)
 Arlington Memorial Bridge, between Virginia and Washington, D.C.